Dorcadion alakoliense is a species of beetle in the family Cerambycidae. It was described by Mikhail Leontievich Danilevsky in 1988. It is known from Kazakhstan.

References

alakoliense
Beetles described in 1988